A Sleep & a Forgetting is the fourth studio album by indie rock band Islands. It was released on February 14, 2012 on ANTI-.

Nicholas Thorburn has called it his "strongest most cohesive record", a record that "deals with loss, with memory and forgetting and with dreaming."

Reception 
At Metacritic, which assigns a weighted average score out of 100 to reviews from mainstream critics, the album received an average score of 69% based on 15 reviews, indicating "generally favorable reviews".

Track listing

References

External links 

2012 albums
Anti- (record label) albums
Islands (band) albums